The eighth season of the American television series El Señor de los Cielos was announced on 15 February 2022. The season is directed by Juan Carlos Valdivia, Conrado Martínez, Mauricio Meneses, and Bernardo Mota, with Karen Barroeta, Ximena Cantuarias, and Harold Sánchez serving as executive producers.

The season premiered on 17 January 2023.

Plot 
The season centers on the return of Aurelio Casillas, who supposedly died at the beginning of the previous season after falling into a coma following an attempt on his life. It is only the DEA who knows that Aurelio is alive, having hidden him in the desert. In enacting his plan of revenge, Aurelio establishes connections with old allies, while also facing new romances and uncovering family mysteries.

Cast

Main 
 Rafael Amaya as Aurelio Casillas
 Rubén Cortada as Fernando Aguirre
 Carmen Aub as Rutila Casillas
 Iván Arana as Ismael Casillas
 África Zavala as Mecha de la Cruz
 Isabella Castillo as Diana Ahumada
 Yuri Vargas as Tracy Lobo
 Alejandro López as El Súper Javi

Recurring 
 Lisa Owen as Alba Casillas
 Robinson Díaz as Miltón Jiménez "El Cabo"
 Salvador Pineda as Julio Zambrana
 Karla Carrillo as Corina Saldaña
 Thali García as Berenice Ahumada
 Alan Slim as Jaime Ernesto Rosales
 Karen Sandoval as Laura Casillas
 Wendy de los Cobos as Aguasanta "Tata" Guerra
 Denia Agalianou as Dalila Zuc
 Carlos Corona as Rigoberto Alfaro
 Daniel Martínez as Guillermo Colón
 José Sedek as Bernardo Castillo
 Daniel Martínez Campos as Arístides Istúriz
 Renata Manterola as Luzma Casillas
 Mimi Morales as Said
 Jorge Cárdenas as Alan Saade
 Maricela González as Eunice Lara "La Felina"
 Elsy Reyes as Carla Uzcátegui
 Roberto Escobar as Commander José Valdés
 Sebastián González as Benjamín
 Brenda Hanst as Caridad Mendoza

Episodes

Notes

Production 
On 15 February 2022, Telemundo announced that it had revived El Señor de los Cielos for an eighth season. In May 2022, a teaser of the season was presented during Telemundo's upfront for the 2022–2023 television season. Filming of the season began on 20 September 2022, with a list of new and returning cast members being announced the same day.

References 

El Señor de los Cielos
2023 American television seasons